The Nuclear Emergency Support Team (NEST), formerly known as the Nuclear Emergency Search Team, is a team of scientists, technicians, and engineers operating under the United States Department of Energy's National Nuclear Security Administration (DOE/NNSA). NEST is the umbrella designation that encompasses all DOE/NNSA radiological and nuclear emergency response functions; some of which date back more than 60 years. NEST's responsibilities include both national security missions—particularly countering weapons of mass destruction (WMD)—and public health and safety, including responses to nuclear reactor accidents. NEST's task is to be 'prepared to respond immediately to any type of radiological accident or incident anywhere in the world'.

History 

Concerns over scenarios involving nuclear accidents or incidents on American soil reach back decades. As early as the 1960s, officials were concerned that a nuclear weapon might be smuggled into the country or that an airplane carrying a nuclear weapon might crash and contaminate surrounding areas.

In late 1974, the FBI received a communication from an extortionist who wanted $200,000 and claimed that a nuclear weapon had been placed somewhere in Boston. President Gerald Ford was warned, and a team of experts from the United States Atomic Energy Commission rushed in, but their radiation detection gear arrived at a different airport. Federal officials then resorted to renting a fleet of vans to carry concealed radiation detectors around the city, but the officials forgot to bring the tools they needed to install the equipment. The incident was later found to be a hoax. However, the government's response highlighted the need for an agency capable of effectively responding to such threats in the future. Later that year, President Ford created the Nuclear Emergency Support Team (NEST), which under the Atomic Energy Act is tasked with investigating the 'illegal use of nuclear materials within the United States, including terrorist threats involving the use of special nuclear materials'.

One of NEST's first responses was in Spokane, Washington on November 23, 1976. An unknown group called Omega mailed an extortion threat claiming they would explode containers of radioactive water all over the city unless they were paid $500,000. NEST immediately flew in a support aircraft from Las Vegas and began searching for non-natural radiation but found nothing. Despite the elaborate instructions initially given by Omega, no further contact was received, and no one made any attempt to claim the (fake) money, which was kept under surveillance. Within days, the incident was deemed a hoax, though the case was never solved. To avoid panic, the public was not notified until a few years later.

One of the more high-profile responses in NEST’s early history took place in August of 1980 when several men planted a sophisticated bomb containing 1,000 pounds of dynamite at Harvey's Resort Hotel in Stateline, Nevada. In addition to explosive ordnance disposal (EOD) personnel from the FBI, NEST experts were brought in to assist in diagnosing and defeating the device. However, attempts to disarm the bomb were unsuccessful, the bomb exploded and caused extensive damage to the hotel and nearby buildings. The limitations of the tactics, tools, and procedures used in the response to the casino bomb—coupled with the fear that a similarly complex device might contain nuclear or radiological material—led to sweeping improvements in NEST’s device defeat capabilities.

A more recent example of a NEST deployment was its response to the 2011 nuclear disaster at the Fukushima Daiichi Nuclear Power Plant in Ōkuma, Fukushima Prefecture, Japan. The event, primarily caused by the 2011 Tōhoku earthquake and tsunami, resulted in the most severe nuclear accident since the Chernobyl disaster in 1986. NEST personnel with expertise in atmospheric modeling, aerial measuring, and health physics were deployed to Japan shortly after the disaster occurred. The scientific advice that NEST provided during this emergency was crucial to informing the responses of both the U.S. and Japanese governments to protect public health.

Today 
According to the Bulletin of the Atomic Scientists, NEST has the ability to deploy as many as 600 people to the scene of a radiological incident, though deployments do not usually exceed 45 people. NEST has a variety of equipment (weighing up to 150 tons) and has the support of a small fleet of aircraft which includes four helicopters and three airplanes, all outfitted with detection equipment.

When an airborne response to an incident is underway, the Federal Aviation Administration grants NEST flights a higher control priority within the United States National Airspace System, designated  with the callsign "FLYNET".

Capabilities 

NEST is a key element of the U.S. strategy to counter nuclear threats, which encompasses a wide range of capabilities that comprise a defense-in-depth against current and emerging dangers. The United States uses this multilayered approach to prevent terrorists from obtaining nuclear weapons or weapons-usable materials, technology, and expertise; counter their efforts to acquire, transfer, or employ these assets; and respond to nuclear incidents, by locating and disabling a nuclear device or managing the consequences of a nuclear detonation. NEST assets serve as part of this defense-in-depth strategy, providing capabilities to prevent, respond to, and mitigate nuclear threats. 
 
NEST is composed of numerous response assets designed to counter WMD threats, respond to accidents involving U.S. nuclear stockpile weapons, and threats to public health and safety. The assets include:

 Accident Response Group (ARG)
 Aerial Measuring System (AMS)
 Disposition and Forensic Evidence Analysis Team (DFEAT)
 DOE Forensics Operations (DFO)
 Joint Technical Operations Team (JTOT)
 National Atmospheric Release Advisory Center (NARAC)
 National Search Team (NST)
 Radiation Emergency Assistance Center / Training Site (REAC/TS)
 Radiological Assistance Program (RAP)

Since 1975, NEST has been warned of 125 nuclear terror threats and has responded to 30. NEST has numerous ways to detect radiation. At first, there were still some problems with this simple distinction, as man-made radiation also includes such things as medical radiation. A man under treatment for Graves' disease with radioactive iodine set off alarms in the New York City subway. After being strip-searched and interrogated he was sent on his way.

Since its initial creation, the detection equipment has been improved and now data can be processed accurately enough to home in on the activity of any single nuclear element desired.

See also 
 Federal Emergency Management Agency 
 Department of Homeland Security
 Broken Arrow
 Nuclear power plant emergency response team

References

Further reading

External links 
 
 
 

United States Department of Energy
Emergency Support Team
Radiation protection organizations